Albert is a town in the Central West region of New South Wales, Australia.

Copper had been discovered in the area by 1900. In the early 20th century, there were several copper mines nearby, the most significant of which was the Iron Duke Mine, which operated from around 1909 until the early 1920s. Around the time that mining commenced, the area was known as 'Albert Water Holes'. Its post office was originally called 'The Alberts' but became Albert in 1916; it closed in 1982. 

A school—known as 'Albertia', until it was renamed Albert in January 1920—opened there in January 1899 and closed in June 1972. The date of the opening of the school, the name of one of its streets, Federation Street, and the timing of the discovery of copper suggests that the village itself dates from around the time of Federation.

Albert is on the Bogan Gate–Tottenham railway line. There was a station at  Albert and a short branch from Albert to the nearby Iron Duke Mine. The branch line was known officially as the Albert Siding to Iron Duke Mine Railway.  The branch line to the mine closed in June 1926.

Gallery

See also
 Lake Albert, New South Wales
 Albert Parish (Delialah County), New South Wales
 Albert Parish (Yantara County) New South Wales
 Albert, (Drake County) New South Wales
 Albert, (Kennedy County) New South Wales
 Albert, (Macquarie County) New South Wales
 Albert, (Sandon County) New South Wales
 Albert, (St Vincent County) New South Wales

References

Towns in New South Wales
Towns in the Central West (New South Wales)
Lachlan Shire
Mining towns in New South Wales